"Lords of the New Church" is a song by British singer-songwriter Tasmin Archer, released in May 1993 as the third single from her debut album, Great Expectations (1992). It peaked at number 26 on the UK Singles Chart.

Writing and recording
Archer describes the song as "it's about the modern breed of politicians and it was written in the very early 1990s even before things became has bad as they are now." Four instruments were used in the recording of "Lords of the New Church", John Hughes, Elliott Randall and Robbie McIntosh provided the guitars in the song whereas John Beck and Paul Wickens played keyboards. The drummer on the track was Charlie Morgan whilst Peter Kaye played the Fairlight CMI.

Critical reception
In his weekly UK chart commentary, James Masterton wrote, "More uptempo than her usual output, the track is very radio friendly and may well equal the success of her last hit." A reviewer from Music & Media said that "Archer marches to rock radio with a midtempo song somewhat in the same vein as latter day Stevie Nicks. Tastes like Jasmin." Damon Albarn and Alex James of Blur reviewed the song for Smash Hits, giving it four out of five. Albarn said, "A nice McTasmin Archer burger, but lacking some of the essential relish."

Track listings
 7-inch vinyl
 "Lords of the New Church"
 "Hero"

 CD single 1
 "Lords of the New Church"
 "Hero"
 "Lords of the New Church" (remix)
 "Sleeping Satellite"

 CD single 2
 "Lords of the New Church"
 "Strings of Desire"
 "The Higher You Climb" (remix)

References

1992 songs
1993 singles
EMI Records singles
Song recordings produced by Julian Mendelsohn
Songs written by John Beck (songwriter)
Songs written by Tasmin Archer
Tasmin Archer songs